Volodymyr Anatoliyovych Baranyuk (born 1974) is a Ukrainian serviceman, Colonel of the Armed Forces of Ukraine, who commanded the 36th Separate Marine Brigade from September 2021 to March 2022. He fought during the Russo-Ukrainian War and is best known for his role during the siege of Mariupol.

Biography

Baranyuk started his military career in 2000, as platoon commander in the 1st Separate Marine Brigade in Crimea. In 2014, at the time of the Russian takeover of Crimea, he was deputy commander of the 1st Separate Marine Battalion, stationed in Feodosia, of which he assumed command in April 2015.

Baranyuk was appointed deputy commander of the 36th Separate Marine Brigade in November 2020, and commander of the brigade in September 2021. At the outbreak of the Russian invasion of Ukraine, in February 2022, the Brigade was stationed in Mariupol, where it became quickly surrounded by the Russian advances from the east and from the southwest. During the subsequent siege, Baranyuk was one of the leaders of the defense of Mariupol, along with the commander of the Azov Regiment, Lieutenant Colonel Denys Prokopenko; Baranyuk was also the highest-ranking officer among the besieged forces. On 19 March 2022, President Volodymyr Zelensky awarded the Order of Hero of Ukraine to Colonel Baranyuk and Lieutenant Colonel Prokopenko.

As the Russian forces gradually captured most of the city, the 36th Separate Marine Brigade entrenched itself within the Illich Steel and Iron Works. In the night between 11 and 12 April, the Brigade attempted a breakout, as a result of which some 500 marines managed to link up with Ukrainian forces present in Azovstal iron and steel works, while an unknown number were killed or captured and over a thousand, including some 400 wounded, were taken prisoner when Russian forces seized the Illich steel plant on the following day. Afterwards, the whereabouts of Colonel Baranyuk became unknown, with Major Serhiy Volynskyi assuming command of the remnants of the Brigade besieged in the Azovstal plant. On 17 April Eduard Basurin, spokesman of the DPR Military Command, claimed that Baranyuk had been killed during the breakout attempt and that his body had been identified, but no evidence was provided for this claim.

On 8 May 2022, Baranyuk appeared alive in an interview with RT, proving previous reports of his death to be false. It was stated that he had been captured in a field a few kilometers north of Mariupol, together with his chief of staff, Colonel Dmytro Kormiankov (who also appeared in the interview), and a number of his men. He is currently held by the Russian Federation as a prisoner of war.

References

External links 
 

1974 births
Recipients of the title of Hero of Ukraine
Recipients of the Order of Bohdan Khmelnytsky, 3rd class
Living people
Prisoners of war held by Russia
Siege of Mariupol
Naval commanders of Ukraine
Ukrainian military personnel of the war in Donbas
Ukrainian military personnel of the 2022 Russian invasion of Ukraine